This is a list of stone circles located in the Dumfries and Galloway council area. It is compiled from Aubrey Burl's 'County Gazetteer of the Stone Circles in Britain, Ireland and Brittany' and the Royal Commission on the Ancient and Historical Monuments of Scotland's 'Canmore' database. Between them, these two sources list 61 stone circles in the region. Many of these have been destroyed, some remains have not been conclusively identified as stone circles, some were dubious before their destruction and some have not been located by modern surveys.

The following sites are the best preserved:

Cauldside Burn
Claughreid
Easthill
Girdle Stanes
Glenquicken
Loupin Stanes
Seven Brethren
Standing Stones of Glenterrow
Torhouskie
Twelve Apostles
Whitcastles

See also 
Stone circles in the British Isles and Brittany
List of stone circles in the Scottish Borders
List of stone circles

References 

List
Dumf